Soyaltepec may refer to:

San Bartolo Soyaltepec, Oaxaca
San Miguel Soyaltepec, Oaxaca
Soyaltepec Mixtec language
Soyaltepec Mazatec language